The Sinclair Service Station is a national historic site located at 5299 Commercial Way, Spring Hill, Florida in Hernando County.

It was added to the National Register of Historic Places on July 27, 2020.

History
The Sinclair Service Station was built by the Sinclair Oil Corporation in 1964. The gas station's roof  design was based on the company logo, which was a Brontosaurus-like dinosaur. It is 47 feet tall and 110 feet long.

In 1967, Harold Hurst bought the station, after which it became Harold's Auto Center.
While in the area filming Larry the Cable Guy's show in 2014 at Weeki Wachee Springs (which was also added to the National Register in 2020), his crew saw the station. They decided to shoot a segment there.

References

External links
Florida Dinosaur Statues; Page 1 (Roadside Architecture.com)

Dinosaur sculptures
National Register of Historic Places in Hernando County, Florida
Gas stations on the National Register of Historic Places in Florida
Sinclair Oil Corporation